Pilín León (born  Carmen Josefina León Crespo, May 19, 1963) is a Venezuelan writer and beauty queen who won the Miss World Venezuela 1981 crown and later Miss World pageant in 1981, held in London, United Kingdom, representing Venezuela.

León was born in Maracay, Aragua.  She became the second Venezuelan (Susana Duijm was the first in 1955) to win the title. As Miss World 1981, she was the first celebrity to switch on the Christmas lights in Oxford Street in 1981.

In 2014, she was guest judge in the final Mister World 2014 beauty pageant in Torbay, England.

External links
Pilin León @ "Bellas Venezolanas"

Miss Venezuela World winners
Miss World winners
Miss World 1981 delegates
People from Maracay
1963 births
Living people
Venezuelan beauty pageant winners